The Artrightis Theatre Group (ART-RIGHT-IS) was established in Bangalore, in 2013. Author and theatre artist Sharmin Ali, brought together a group of amateur and professional theatre enthusiasts and started Artrightis. They have staged numerous plays around Bangalore. Sharmin Ali started her theatrical career with her first performance on stage at the Alliance française, Bangalore. Soon after, she started her own production house ART-RIGHT-IS. 
The most famous shows by ART-RIGHT-IS include Chutzpah and EREBUS- darkness personified, which were showcased in Bangalore and received critical acclaim.

Selected Productions 
 Potli Baba Ki Paltan was staged On 1 May 2014 at Rangoli Arts Center, MG Road. It was a production performed by a group of amateurs, experts and theatre enthusiasts. For the first time, there was a combination of gurus and shishyas on stage, being directed by a group of both first-time and expert directors. The show encompassed short sketches from various genres like comedy, drama, tragedy, etc.
 EREBUS- Darkness Personified was staged on 14 June 2014, at the Rangoli Metro Arts Centre, MG Road. It was based on the Greek mythology portraying several shades of the Greek God Erebus who personifies darkness. Art-Right-Is Company's production of Erebus had seven monologues for ten minutes each and tried to convey the modern-day implications of the darkness the Greek deity personified. The show describes itself as "An orgasm that lasts for 70 minutes: Self-Hedonism and Paranoia!”.
 The Penis Monologues originally written by Jason Cassidy, was adapted and produced for the Indian audience by ART-RIGHT-IS and first staged on 28 August 2014 in Bangalore. Jason Cassidy granted Sharmin Ali the privilege to adapt his play to suit the Indian audience. While the initial plan was that Ali would direct the play, as the rehearsals began, three directors joined in, each directing the monologues. The lack of any props, apart from a single chair and central spotlight, is compensated by an intense script. While it is comic, the play sends across a message loud and clear - women need to understand and respect a man's emotional needs.
 Aurora was staged on 22 November 2014, at Alliance Francaise de Bangalore. Aurora was a collection short plays.
 Chutzpah  premiered on 17 April 2015, at Chowdiah Memorial Hall, Bangalore. The play is titled ‘Chutzpah’ (Hebrewish word). ‘Chutzpah’ refers to audacity, indignance and the power to do something unconventional. The characters are based on women who have broken free from their inhibitions and defied the stereotype. The play celebrates the latent power of all women in a 90-minute musical satire written by Sharmin Ali herself, in a time when gender issues are being addressed more frequently in India. A group of activists took offence to the play's title, ‘Chutzpah’, a Hebrew word meaning audacity. They mispronounced and misunderstood the title as a vulgar word in Hindi.

References

Theatre in India
Theatrical organisations in India
Theatre companies in India